George Ashmun (December 25, 1804 – July 16, 1870) was a Whig member of the U.S. House of Representatives from Massachusetts.

Ashmun was born in Blandford, Massachusetts to Eli P. Ashmun and Lucy Hooker. He graduated from Yale in 1823 and was married to Martha E. Hall in 1828. He served in the Massachusetts House of Representatives from 1833 to 1837, and the Massachusetts Senate from 1838 to 1840. In 1841, he returned to the Massachusetts House where he served as Speaker.

Ashmun was elected to the U.S. Congress from the Sixth District of Massachusetts in 1844, held office from 1845 to 1851 and was a member of the committees on the judiciary, Indian affairs, and rules. He opposed the Mexican–American War, and was a strong supporter of Daniel Webster.

And the birth of the Republican Party
After leaving Congress, Ashmun moved to Springfield, Massachusetts where he spent the rest of his life practicing law in the firm Chapman & Ashmun, founded with Reuben A. Chapman. There he met newspaper publisher Samuel Bowles (journalist), with whom he helped to found the U.S. Republican Party. Immediately, Ashmun joined the Republican Party, and presided over the Republican Party's convention in 1860 that nominated Abraham Lincoln for President.

Death
George Ashmun died in Springfield, Massachusetts on July 16, 1870. He was buried in Springfield Cemetery.

See also
 62nd Massachusetts General Court (1841)

References

 "Ashmun, George." Dictionary of American Biography. Vol. 1, Charles Scribner's Sons. 1928.
 American National Biography, vol. 1, p. 684.
 

1804 births
1870 deaths
People from Blandford, Massachusetts
American people of English descent
Whig Party members of the United States House of Representatives from Massachusetts
Republican Party members of the Massachusetts House of Representatives
Speakers of the Massachusetts House of Representatives
Massachusetts state senators
Politicians from Springfield, Massachusetts
Yale University alumni